Here Comes a Song is the second studio album by Australian children's music group, The Wiggles. released in 1992 by ABC Music distributed by EMI.

Track list
All music by or trad. arr. by M. Cook/J. Fatt/G. Page/A. Field except listed below.

Personnel
The Wiggles
 Anthony Field – jaws harp, tin whistle, vocals, tambourine, bodhrán, digeridoo, guitar, hand claps
 Greg Page – lead vocals, guitar, hand claps
 Jeff Fatt – accordion, piano, organ, xylophone, vocals, hand claps, "Jerome's" voice
 Murray Cook – guitar, bass, vocals, kabasa

Additional musicians
 Jane Bezzina – backing vocals on "Little Brown Ant", "The Magic Kindy", "We're All Friends", "Come and Sail the Sea" and "Daniel and Molly"
 Rosemary Richardson – backing vocals on "Henry the Octopus", "Dungley Wobble" and vocals on "A Family Song".
 Peter Mackie – guitar on "The Gypsy Rover"

References

The Wiggles albums
1992 albums